The Tennessee Bankers Association is a trade association for the banking industry in Tennessee, USA. It was established on October 13, 1890 in Memphis, Tennessee.

References

1890 establishments in Tennessee
Organizations established in 1890
Bankers associations
Business and finance professional associations
Banking in the United States